Francis Hamilton Moncreiff (29 September 1906 – 3 September 1984) was an Anglican bishop.

Early life and education 
Moncreiff was born in North Berwick, East Lothian, the son of James Hamilton Moncreiff. He was educated at Shrewsbury and then St John's College, Cambridge (Bachelor of Arts, 1927; Master of Arts 1931). He trained for the ordained ministry at Ripon College Cuddesdon. He was awarded a Doctor of Divinity from the University of Glasgow in 1967.

Ordained ministry
Moncreiff was ordained deacon in 1930 and priest in 1931 by the Bishop of Ely. He began his ordained ministry with curacies  at St Giles' Cambridge (1930 to 1935) and then St Augustine's in Kilburn (1935 to 1941). After this he was priest in charge of St Salvador's Church in Edinburgh from 1941 to 1947 and its rector until 1951. He also served as chaplain at H.M. Prison in Edinburgh between 1942 and 1951, and was a canon of the St Mary's Cathedral chapter in Edinburgh between 1950 and 1952.

Bishop
In 1952, he was elected Bishop of Glasgow and Galloway and was consecrated on 15 July 1952 at St Mary's Cathedral, Glasgow. A decade later, Primus of Scotland, posts he held until his retirement in 1973.

References

1881 births
People from North Berwick
People educated at Shrewsbury School
Alumni of St John's College, Cambridge
Alumni of Ripon College Cuddesdon
Bishops of Glasgow and Galloway
Primuses of the Scottish Episcopal Church
20th-century Scottish Episcopalian bishops
1984 deaths